Liao is a Chinese surname, most commonly found in Taiwan and Southern China. Statistics show it is among the 100 most common surnames in mainland China; figures from the Ministry of Public Security showed it to be the 61st most common surname, shared by around 4.2 million Chinese citizens.

Its Cantonese pronunciation is generally transcribed as Liu. Other romanisations of the name include Leo, Leow, Liau, Liaw, Liauw, Leeau, Lio, Liow, Leaw, Leou, Lau, Loh, Liu, Liêu, Liew, Liw and Lew.

Notable people surnamed 廖

People with the surname Liao include:
 Ashley Liao (born 2001), American actress
 Bernice Liu (born 1979), Canadian actress and former TVB model
 Liao Cheng-hao, Minister of Justice of the Republic of China (1996–1998)
 Liao Chengzhi (1908–1983), Chinese politician
 Liao Chi-chun (1902–1976), Taiwanese oil painter and sculptor
 Liao Feng-teh (1951–2008), Taiwanese politician
 Gladys Liu, Hong Kong-born Australian politician
 Liao Hua (died 264), military general
 Liao Hui (born 1942), Hong Kong politician
 Liao Hui (born 1987), Chinese weightlifter
 Liao Liou-yi, Magistrate of Taichung County (1989–1997)
 Martin Liao (born 1957), Hong Kong politician
 Liao Qiuyun (born 1995), Chinese weightlifter
 Liao Tianding
 Liao Yaoxiang (1906–1968), a high-ranking Kuomintang commander
 Liao Yiwu (born 1958), Chinese author and poet
 Liao Zhongkai (1877–1925), Kuomintang leader
 Liau Huei-fang, Deputy Minister of Labor of the Republic of China (2016–2017)
Liow Han Heng, Singaporean convicted killer

See also
 Five Great Clans of the New Territories

References

Chinese-language surnames
Individual Chinese surnames